Karolína Plíšková was the defending champion, but chose to compete in Tokyo instead.

Irina-Camelia Begu won the title, defeating Aliaksandra Sasnovich in the final, 6–3, 6–1.

Seeds

Draw

Finals

Top half

Bottom half

Qualifying

Seeds

Qualifiers

Qualifying draw

First qualifier

Second qualifier

Third qualifier

Fourth qualifier

External links
Main draw
Qualifying draw

2015 Singles
Korea Open Singles
Korea Open Singles